This is a list of episodes for The Daily Show with Trevor Noah in 2020.

Due to the coronavirus pandemic, Noah began filming episodes from his home for the show's YouTube channel. On March 23, episodes—now titled The Daily Social Distancing Show with Trevor Noah—began to air on television. On April 27, episodes were expanded to 45 minutes.

2020

January

February

March

April

May

June

July

August

September

October

November
December

References

 
Daily Show guests
Daily Show guests
Daily Show guests